Nils Edvard Kreuger (11 October 1858 – 11 May 1930) was a Swedish painter. He specialized in landscapes and rural scenes.

Biography
His father, Johan August (1821–1887), operated a lumber and wood products business. In 1874, he began his studies at the Royal Swedish Academy of Fine Arts, but was forced to discontinue them due to illness. In 1878, he was able to resume studying at the private painting school of Edvard Perséus. He then went to Paris, in 1881, and studied with Jean-Paul Laurens at the Académie Colarossi. Much of his time was spent painting en plein aire in Grez-sur-Loing. As his style progressed, he showed a preference for painting at dawn or dusk, in haze or rain. His first exhibition at the Salon came in 1882.

After 1885, he was a supporter of the Opponenterna, a group that was opposed to the outmoded teaching methods at the Royal Academy. He was also active in creating the Konstnärsförbundet (Artists' Union). At this time, he abandoned painting en plein aire in favor of Romantic nationalism. In 1886, he married Bertha Elisabeth von Essen (1857–1932), the daughter of an army officer, and settled in Bourg-la-Reine.

It was a reaction to the prevailing realistic style of landscape painting and may have been inspired by Bergh's attraction to the works of Paul Gauguin. He was also influenced by Van Gogh, whose paintings were exhibited in Copenhagen in 1893.

In 1896, he moved to Stockholm, but visited Öland in the summers, where he painted cows and horses. After 1900, his palette lightened and he began adding dots to his work. In his final years, he had problems with his eyesight, but was able to continue painting.

His works may be seen in the Nationalmuseum, Prins Eugens Waldemarsudde, the Thiel Gallery, and the Gothenburg Museum of Art.

Industrialist Ivar Kreuger was his cousin.

Selected paintings

References

External links 

 Biography @ the Svenskt Biografiskt Lexikon
 More works by Kreuger @ ArtNet

1858 births
1930 deaths
19th-century Swedish painters
Swedish male painters
20th-century Swedish painters
19th-century Swedish male artists
20th-century Swedish male artists